Civic Initiative for Freedom, Justice and Survival (GI SPO) is a Serb minority political organization in Kosovo. It has one seat in the Assembly of Kosovo. GI SPO is led by Milan Dabić and its only MP is Cvetko Veljković, former head of the Office for Communities in the government of Albin Kurti.

History 
GI SPO participated in the 2021 Kosovan parliamentary election. Among its candidates were Rada Trajković, a former minister of family and services in the Government of Serbia from 1998 to 2000 and Cvetko Veljković, former head of the Office for Communities in the government of Albin Kurti. The organization was endorsed by Nenad Rašić and his Progressive Democratic Party. During the election campaign, Veljković and Rašić, together with Albin Kurti, visited Štrpce. The organization only won 1,508 votes or 0.17% of the popular vote, failing to gain none of the 10 seats reserved for the Kosovo Serb community. The Serbian-backed Serb List (SL) won all 10 seats reserved for the Kosovo Serb community with 5.09% of the popular vote.

Following the resignation of all 10 Serb List MP's in on 7 November 2022, the Kosovo Serb community lost its representatives in the Assembly of Kosovo. On 17 November, Serb List MP's were replaced by new MP's, most of whom are from the same party, and by Cvetko Veljković, making GI SPO a parliamentary organization.

Electoral performance

Parliamentary elections

References 

Political parties in Kosovo
Serb political parties in Kosovo